Indro Alessandro Raffaello Schizogene Montanelli  (22 April 1909 – 22 July 2001) was an Italian journalist, historian and writer. He was one of the fifty World Press Freedom Heroes according to the International Press Institute.

A volunteer for the Second Italo-Ethiopian War and an admirer of Benito Mussolini's dictatorship, Montanelli had a change of heart in 1943, and joined the liberal resistance group Giustizia e Libertà but was discovered and arrested along with his wife by Nazi authorities in 1944. Sentenced to death, he was able to flee to Switzerland the day before his scheduled execution by firing squad thanks to a secret service double-agent.

After the Second World War, Montanelli for many decades distinguished himself as a staunch conservative columnist, and in 1977 the terrorist group Brigate Rosse tried to assassinate him. He was also a popular novelist and historian, especially remembered for his monumental Storia d'Italia (History of Italy) in 22 volumes. He worked as editor of Silvio Berlusconi-owned newspaper il Giornale for many years but was opposed to Berlusconi's political ambitions, and quit as editor of il Giornale in 1994.

In the wake of the 2020 Black Lives Matter protests, Montanelli came under scrutiny for his racist attitudes and actions. While working at the fascist magazine Civiltà Fascista, Montanelli wrote many articles expressing racist ideas, declaring the superiority of the white race, and supporting colonialist ideals. While stationed in Italian Ethiopia during the Ethiopian War, Montanelli married a 12-year old Eritrean girl (as it was custom for the institution of the ""), who later chose to marry an Eritrean officer of his platoon. Since through modern-day values this is considered rape, protestors defaced a statue erected for him in Milan in the wake of the BLM movement and demanded it be removed.

Biography

Early life

Indro Montanelli was born in Fucecchio, near Florence, on April 22, 1909. His father, Sestilio Montanelli, was a high-school philosophy teacher and his mother, Maddalena Doddoli, the daughter of a rich cotton merchant. The name "Indro" was chosen by his father after the Hindu god Indra.

Montanelli obtained a law degree from the University of Florence in 1930, with a thesis on the electoral reform of Benito Mussolini's fascist regime. Allegedly, in this thesis, he maintained that rather than a reform it amounted to the abolition of elections. According to him, it was during his permanence in Grenoble, while he was taking language lessons, that he realised that his true vocation was that of a journalist.

Early journalistic career

Montanelli began his journalistic career by writing for the fascist newspaper Il Selvaggio ("The Savage"), then directed by Mino Maccari, and in 1932 for the Universale, a magazine published only once fortnightly and which offered no pay. Montanelli admitted that in those days he saw in fascism the hope of a movement that could potentially create an Italian national conscience that would have resolved the social and economic differences between the north and the south. This enthusiasm for the fascist movement began to wane when in 1935 Mussolini ordered the suppression of the Universale along with other magazines and newspapers that expressed critical opinions on the nature of Fascism.

But it was in 1934, in Paris that Montanelli began to write for the crime pages of the daily newspaper Paris-Soir, then as foreign correspondent in Norway (where he fished for cod for a bit), and later in Canada (where he ended up working on a farm in Alberta).

From there he began a collaboration with Webb Miller of the United Press in New York. While working for the United Press he learned to write for the lay public in an uncomplicated style that would distinguish him within the realm of Italian journalism. One lesson he took to heart from Miller was to "always write as if writing to a milkman from Ohio". This open and approachable style was something he never forgot and he'd often recall that very quote during his long life. Another memorable anecdote from Montanelli's time in the United States occurred while he was teaching a course. One of the students had asked him to explain the meaning of the essay that Montanelli had just read out. Montanelli told him he'd repeat it since he clearly didn't understand... Hitting the table, the red-faced student cut him off and angrily told him, as a matter of fact, that if he hadn't understood Montanelli's essay, then it was Montanelli who was the imbecile! [and needed to change it]. It was then that he realized that he, who had come from the authoritarian regime of fascist Italy, had just had a confrontation with democracy. During this time Montanelli conducted his first interview with a celebrity: Henry Ford – who surprised him by admitting he did not have a driver's license. During the interview, surrounded by American art depicting pastoral and frontier subjects, Ford began to reverentially talk about the Founding Fathers. Looking at the decor, Montanelli astutely asked him how he felt about having destroyed their world. Puzzled, Ford asked what he meant. Undaunted, Montanelli pressed on that the automobile and Ford's revolutionary assembly line system had forever transformed the country. Ford looked shocked, and Montanelli realized that, like all geniuses, Ford hadn't had the slightest idea of what he'd really done.

Reporter in Abyssinia

When Mussolini invaded Abyssinia in 1935 with the intent of making Italy an empire (Second Italo–Abyssinian War), Montanelli immediately abandoned his collaboration with the United Press and became a voluntary conscript for this war. Aged 23, Montanelli was put in charge of a 100-strong army of local men. "It was a beautiful two years" he later said. He said he believed then that this was the chance for Italy to bring civilization to the 'savage' world of Africa. While stationed in east Africa, Montanelli bought and married a 12-year-old Bilen child to act as his sex slave, a common practice of Italian soldiers in Abyssinia. 

Montanelli began writing about the war to his father who – without Montanelli's knowledge – sent the letters to one of the most famous journalists of those times, Ugo Ojetti, who published them regularly on the most prestigious Italian newspaper, Il Corriere della Sera.

Reporter during the Spanish Civil War
On his return from Abyssinia, Montanelli became foreign correspondent in Spain for the daily newspaper Il Messaggero, where he experienced the Spanish Civil War on the side of Francisco Franco's troops. In this period he shared a room with Kim Philby, who, decades later, would reveal himself to the world as one of the greatest Soviet mole spies that ever existed. One day he disappeared. Years later Montanelli received a mysterious note saying: "Thanks for everything. Including your socks". It was Philby. After the capture of the city of Santander, Montanelli wrote that '(...) it had been a long military walk with only one enemy: the heat'. This judgement contrasted with the propaganda of the times that painted that 'battle' as a glorious bloodshed on the side of the Italian contingent. In fact the only casualty he noted, but never reported, by Montanelli was a single death in the Alpini regiment caused by a mule kick that threw the unfortunate trooper down into a dry river bed. For this article he was repatriated, tried and expelled from the Fascist party and from the official organization of Italian Journalists (known as the Albo dei Giornalisti in Italian). When, in the trial, he was asked why he had written such an unpatriotic article, he replied: "Show me a single casualty of that battle: because a battle without casualties is not a real battle!" The trial ended with a full absolution.

Journalistic activity during World War II

Eastern and Northern Europe

The stand Montanelli took against Fascism led him to his first serious conflicts with the Italian authorities. His Fascist Party (PNF:Partito Nazionale Fascista in Italian) membership was revoked thereafter and Montanelli did nothing to regain this important document which at the time conferred a series of important privileges on its holders; the country was after all dominated by Mussolini's Fascist movement. So to avoid the worst, in 1938, the then minister of culture, Giuseppe Bottai, offered Montanelli the job of director of the Institute of Culture in Tallinn, Estonia, and lecturer in Italian at the University of Tartu. In this period the then director of Il Corriere della Sera, Aldo Borelli, asked Montanelli to engage in a 'collaboration' as foreign correspondent (he could not be employed as journalist, because this had been forbidden by the fascist regime). Montanelli began to correspond for this newspaper from Estonia and Albania (during the Italian annexation of this country).

On 1 September 1939 Germany invaded Poland. Montanelli was sent to report from the front in a Mercedes accompanied by German state functionaries. In the vicinity to the city of Grudziądz the car was stopped by a convoy of German tanks. On one of these stood Hitler himself, but a few feet from Montanelli. When Hitler was told that the only person in casual clothes was Italian, he jumped out of the tank and eyeing Montanelli like a madman, began a ten-minute hysterical speech followed by military salute and exit. Albert Speer, who had also been in the convoy with fellow artist Arno Breker, corroborated the story in 1979. Apart from this episode – which Montanelli was forbidden to report – there had been little to report because the invasion of Poland was completed so rapidly that it was over within weeks. It was allegedly him who reported about the Skirmish of Krojanty and created a myth from it.

Montanelli was not welcome in Italy, and decided to move to Lithuania. The joint German-Russian invasion of Poland instinctively told him that more was brewing on the Soviet Union border. His instinct was correct because shortly after his arrival in Kaunas – the seat of Lithuanian government – the Soviet Union issued its ultimatum to the Baltic Republics. At this point Montanelli continued to travel towards Tallinn as it was his wish to see the last of a free and democratic Estonia, which was soon invaded by Soviet Union. At this point, Montanelli was not popular in Italy, nor Germany because of his pro-Estonian and pro-Polish articles and had been expelled by the Soviet Union for being a foreigner. So he was forced by the events to cross the Baltic sea and reach Helsinki.

In Finland Montanelli began writing articles about the Lapps and the reindeer, although this was not for long as Molotov had made requests on the Finnish government for the annexation of part of the Finnish land to the Soviet Union. The Finnish delegation, headed by Paasikivi, had refused to give in to these requests and on their return it was clear that war was in the air. Montanelli was not able to write about the details of the talks between the Soviet and Finnish delegations, as they were shrouded in strict secrecy, although he was able to interview Paasikivi, who was happy to fill him in on everything except for the content of the talks.

Throughout the so-called Winter War which ensued, Montanelli wrote hotly pro-Finnish articles both from the front and from bomb-stricken Helsinki writing about the almost mythical enterprises of the battle of Tolvajärvi, and of men like captain Pajakka who with 200 Lapps successfully confronted 40,000 Russians in the region of Petsamo. Back in Italy Montanelli's stories had been followed with great enthusiasm by the public, but not so enthusiastic was the response of the fascist leaders who were committed to an alliance with the Soviet Union. When Borelli, director of Il Corriere della Sera, had been ordered to censor Montanelli's articles, he had had the courage to reply that "thanks to his articles the Corriere increased its sales from 500,000 to 900,000 copies: are you going to reimburse me?". When the Winter War was over, and the non-aggression pact was signed between the Soviet Union and Finland, Montanelli was personally thanked by the elusive Mannerheim himself, for writing in favour of the Finnish cause.

Invasion of Norway
Before his return to Italy Montanelli witnessed the invasion of Norway, and was arrested by the German army for his hostility towards the German-Italian alliance. He escaped with the help of his friend Vidkun Quisling, and made a run for the north of the country where the English and the French were disembarking their troops at Narvik. He was met by the one-eyed, one-armed Major Carton de Wiart who explained that there were no more than 10,000 Allied troops in Norway – many of them not even trained for battle. Nobody seemed to know where their garrison was. The British wanted to go inland and attack the Germans, but the French wanted to stay put and consolidate their positions. After having seen the clockwork invasion of Poland by the German troops, Montanelli found this disarray a worrying sight. When the Germans began bombing these positions the Allies were forced to embark once again and beat a hasty withdrawal to England.

Balkans and Greece 
With Italy's entrance in the war (June 1940), Montanelli was sent to France and the Balkans; then he was assigned the responsibility of following the Italian military campaign from Greece and Albania as correspondent. Here, he recounted to have written little: "I remained at that front various months, writing almost nothing, a small reason was because I fell ill with typhus and a huge one because I refused to push as a glorious military campaign the quaking pummeling that we caught down there."

An article published on 12 September 1940 issue of Panorama was considered "defeatist" by the censors of Minculpop (Ministry of Popular Culture), who in turn ordered the closure of the periodical.

Arrested and sentenced to death
After witnessing war and destruction in the Balkans, and the disastrous Italian invasion of Greece, Montanelli decided to join the Italian resistance movement against the fascist regime, by joining the liberal Giustizia e Libertà clandestine group. Here he met socialist leader Sandro Pertini (who would later become president of Italy from 1978 to 1985).

He was eventually once again captured by the Germans, tried and sentenced to death. In the Milanese prison of San Vittore he met Mike Bongiorno, who would later become one of the most famous Italian television personalities. In prison he also made the acquaintance of General Della Rovere, who was said to have been arrested while on a secret mission on behalf of the Allies. In fact, this man was a thief called Giovanni Bertoni, a spy for the Germans. But Bertoni was so taken in by the military character he was playing that he refused to relay any information to his German captors and was executed like a real enemy official. After the war Montanelli dedicated a book to this incident (Il generale Della Rovere, 1959, later turned into an award-winning movie directed by Roberto Rossellini and starring Vittorio De Sica).

Salvation came at the end of 1944 with the help of unknown conspirators who arranged for his transfer to a prison in Verona. The transfer was then transformed into a dash for the Swiss border. The identity of these conspirators remained a mystery until decades later, when it appeared that it had been the result of collusion by several agencies. Among them, Marshall Mannerheim allegedly put pressure on his German allies ("You are executing a gentleman" he said to von Falkenhorst, the commander of the German troops stationed in Finland) resulting in Berlin's opening of an inquiry.

In 1945 while hiding in Switzerland, he published the novel Drei Kreuze (Three Crosses), later appeared in Italian with the title Qui non-riposano (Here they do not rest). Inspired by Thornton Wilder's The Bridge of San Luis Rey, the story begins on 17 September 1944 when a Val d'Ossola priest buries three unknown corpses and commemorates them with three anonymous crosses.

Career after World War II
Throughout the post-war years, Montanelli retained an idiosyncratic and particularly undiplomatic style, even when this made him very unpopular among his peers and employers. This is well illustrated in his book La stecca nel coro (which translates as "The false note in the chorus" with the meaning of "Going against the current") which is a list of leading articles he composed between 1974 and 1994.

After the war, Montanelli resumed his career at Il Corriere della Sera, famously authoring deeply sympathetic articles from Hungary, during the 1956 Hungarian Revolution. His first hand reportages inspired him to write the play, I sogni muoiono all'alba (Dreams Die at Dawn), later adapted to film. In 1959, Montanelli interviewed for the first time in history a Pope, office at the time held by Pope John XXIII; the Pope declared that he picked Montanelli exactly because he was an atheist and not a Catholic sympathizer. From the mid-1960s, after the death of the newspaper's owners, Mario and Vittorio Crespi, and the serious illness of the third brother, Aldo, the ownership of the newspaper passed upon Aldo's daughter, Giulia Maria. Under her tight control (earning her Montanelli's moniker the czarina), the daily took a sudden turn to the left. This new launch took place in 1972 with the abrupt dismissal of director Giovanni Spadolini. Montanelli expressed a cutting indictment of the procedure in an interview on L'espresso, declaring: "A director is not sent away like a thieving house-servant" and, turning to the Crespi family, he branded their "authoritarian, bullying junta ways that they have chosen in order to impose their decision".

Founding of il Giornale and assassination attempt
After breaking with Il Corriere della Sera he founded and directed a new conservative daily, Il Giornale, from 1973 to 1994, together with Enzo Bettiza.

On 2 September 1977, Montanelli was shot four times in the legs by a two-man commando of the Red Brigades, outside the Milanese head-office of Il Corriere della Sera. His friend and surgeon was amazed at how "four shots could hit those [long, thin] chicken legs of his and still completely miss a major artery or nerve bundle". He credited his indoctrination as a child in the Balilla fascist youth and its mantra, "to die on your feet", for saving his life. He maintained that had he not held on to the railing during the incident the fourth shot would have surely hit him in the stomach. In his typical ironical and satirical vein he also thanked Il Duce. In a petty instance of insult to injury Il Corriere della Sera dedicated an article to the incident omitting his name from the title ("Milan [...] journalist kneecapped").

Quarrel with Berlusconi and final years

When Silvio Berlusconi, who since 1977 had held the majority of shares in Il Giornale, entered politics with the founding of a new populist political party, Forza Italia, Montanelli came under heavy pressure to switch his editorial line to a position favourable to Berlusconi. Montanelli never hid his bad opinion of Berlusconi: "He lies as he breathes", the journalist declared. In the end, protesting his independence, he founded a new daily, for which he resurrected the name La Voce ("The Voice"), which had belonged to a renowned newspaper run by Giuseppe Prezzolini. La Voce, which had garnered a devoted but limited readership, folded after about a year, and Montanelli returned to Il Corriere della Sera. In 1994, Montanelli was awarded the International Editor of the Year Award from the World Press Review.

From 1995 to 2001 he was the chief letters editor of Il Corriere della Sera, answering a letter a day on a page of the newspaper known as "La Stanza di Montanelli" ("Montanelli's Room"). Montanelli spent his last years vigorously opposing Silvio Berlusconi's politics. He was mentor to a significant group of colleagues, followers and students including Mario Cervi, Marco Travaglio, Paolo Mieli, Roberto Ridolfi, Andrea Claudio Galluzzo, Beppe Severgnini and Roberto Gervaso.

He died on 22 July 2001 at the La Madonnina clinic in Milan. The following day, Il Corriere della Sera published a letter on its front page: "Indro Montanelli's farewell to his readers."

Awards and decorations

 Commander, First Class, of the Order of the Lion of Finland

Legacy 
Montanelli had been nicknamed "The prince of journalism" by his own colleagues while he was still alive, gaining large esteem and consent even from liberals and left-oriented journalists; Enzo Biagi, Giorgio Bocca, Aldo Grasso, Gianfrancesco Zincone and many others considered him a master of the profession and his objectivity and attention to history as a model to teach and replicate. He said in his letters "If you lack the holy fire inside, if you're not made for this work, if you lack a natural appendice with a typewriter... it's pointless to do this job". He left for posterity a number of first-person reportages and interviews with important historical figures, including De Gaulle, Mussolini, Pope John XXII and Churchill. 

While working as a journalist for the fascist magazine Civiltà Fascista, Montanelli had argued that soldiers should under no circumstances fraternise with black people, at least "until they had been given a culture" . In June 2020, a statue of Indro Montanelli in Milan was vandalized by activists, in the context of the Black Lives Matter movement. This was done to highlight the fact that, when aged 24 and working in Italian Ethiopia (former Abyssinia), he married a young girl by buying her from her family, as was customary among locals, and in his interviews affectionately referred to her as "a little docile animal". In a 1969 episode of the talk show L'ora della verità (The hour of the truth), Montanelli told host Gianni Bisiach of his child-bride: "I think I chose well. She was a beautiful girl of 12 years," adding, "I'm sorry. But in Africa it's different." During the interview, his account was interrupted by a question from the feminist and journalist Elvira Banotti, who asked him how he could justify his marriage to a child, since marriage in Europe to a 12-year-old girl would be considered abhorrent; Montanelli replied that "in Abyssinia that's how it works", and that "at 12 years they normally marry, they are women already." The relationship has never been described as violent or nonconsensual, and both the family and the girl have always been reported as agreeing to it; the girl herself still showed affection towards Montanelli years after their separation by naming her first-born child Indro. The marriage falls into what was known as the madamato practice, a relationship between Italian men and local women which was commonplace in the then Italian colonies.

The very historian that first researched Italian war crimes in Ethiopia, Angelo Del Boca, retained great esteem for Montanelli and even defended his marriage with the young girl. "It makes no sense [to call him a racist and rapist]", the historian said, "it was an act of integration, especially since Montanelli kept a good relationship with her for years." "At the time, but maybe even nowadays, it was normal to marry women of that age in Africa; it was initially encouraged as an element of fraternization."

Milan's mayor, Giuseppe Sala, refused to remove the statue, arguing that "lives should be judged in their totality", while recognising his dismay at the lightness of the way Montanelli spoke about his actions in Abyssinia.

References

Bibliography 

 Alessandro Scurani, Montanelli. Pro e contro, Milano, Letture, 1971.
 Gennaro Cesaro, Dossier Montanelli, Napoli, Fausto Fiorentino, 1974.
 Gastone Geron, Montanelli. Il coraggio di dare la notizia, Milano, La Sorgente, 1975.
 Marcello Staglieno, Il Giornale 1974-1980, Milano, Società europea di edizioni, 1980.
 Tommaso Giglio, Un certo Montanelli, Milano, Sperling & Kupfer, 1981.
 Claudio Mauri, Montanelli l'eretico, Milano, SugarCo, 1982.
 Marcello Staglieno, Indro Montanelli, Milano, Sidalm-Comune di Milano, 1982.
 Tullio Ciarrapico (a cura di), Indro Montanelli. Una vita per la cultura. Letteratura: giornalismo, Roma, Ente Fiuggi, 1985.
 Donato Mutarelli, Montanelli visto da vicino, Milano, Ediforum, 1992.
 Ettore Baistrocchi, Lettere a Montanelli, Roma, Palazzotti, 1993.
 Piero Malvolti, Indro Montanelli, Fucecchio, Edizioni dell'Erba, 1993.
 Mario Cervi e Gian Galeazzo Biazzi Vergani, I vent'anni del "Giornale" di Montanelli. 25 giugno 1974 - 12 gennaio 1994, Milano, Rizzoli, 1994, .
 Giancarlo Mazzuca,  Indro Montanelli: la mia "Voce". Storia di un sogno impossibile raccontata da Giancarlo Mazzuca, Milano, Sperling & Kupfer, 1995, .
 Federico Orlando, Il sabato andavamo ad Arcore. La vera storia, documenti e ragioni, del divorzio tra Berlusconi e Montanelli, Bergamo, Larus, 1995, .
 Marcello Staglieno, Il Novecento visto da Montanelli: l'eretico della destra italiana, suppl. a "Lo Stato", Roma, 20 gennaio 1998.
 Marco Delpino, a cura di e con Paolo Riceputi, Indro Montanelli: un cittadino scomodo e un'analisi sulla stampa italiana, Santa Margherita Ligure, Tigullio-Bacherontius, 1999.
 Federico Orlando, Fucilate Montanelli. Dall'assalto al «Giornale» alle elezioni del 13 maggio, Roma, Editori Riuniti, 2001, .
 Marcello Staglieno, Montanelli. Novant'anni controcorrente, Milano, Mondadori, 2001, .
 Giorgio Soavi, Indro. Due complici che si sono divertiti a vivere e a scrivere, Collezione Il Cammeo n.388, Milano, Longanesi, 2002, .
 Gian Luca Mazzini, Montanelli mi ha detto. Avventure, aneddoti, ricordi del più grande giornalista italiano, Rimini, Il Cerchio, 2002, .
 Giorgio Torelli, Il Padreterno e Montanelli, Milano, Ancora, 2003, .
 Paolo Granzotto, Montanelli, Bologna, il Mulino, 2004, .
 Marco Travaglio, Montanelli e il Cavaliere. Storia di un grande e di un piccolo uomo, Prefazione di Enzo Biagi, Milano, Garzanti, 2004 ; Nuova edizione ampliata nella Collana Saggi, con un saggio introduttivo inedito dell'Autore, Milano, Garzanti, 2009, .
 Paolo Avanti e Alessandro Frigerio, A cercar la bella destra. I ragazzi di Montanelli, Milano, Mursia, 2005, .
 Sandro Gerbi e Raffaele Liucci, Lo stregone. La prima vita di Indro Montanelli, Torino, Einaudi, 2006, .
 Renata Broggini, Passaggio in Svizzera. L'anno nascosto di Indro Montanelli, Milano, Feltrinelli, 2007, .
 Federica Depaolis e Walter Scancarello (a cura di), Indro Montanelli. Bibliografia 1930-2006, Pontedera, Bibliografia e Informazione, 2007, .
 Giancarlo Mazzuca, Testimoni del Novecento, Bologna, Poligrafici Editoriale, 2008.
 Sandro Gerbi e Raffaele Liucci, Montanelli l'anarchico borghese. La seconda vita 1958-2001, Torino, Einaudi, 2009, .
 Giorgio Torelli, Non avrete altro Indro. Montanelli raccontato con nostalgia, Milano, Ancora, 2009, .
 Iacopo Bottazzi, Montanelli Reporter. Da Addis Abeba a Zagabria in viaggio con un grande giornalista, Roma-Reggio Emilia, Aliberti, 2011, .
 Federica De Paolis, Tra i libri di Indro: percorsi in cerca di una biblioteca d'autore, Pontedera, Bibliografia e Informazione, 2013, .
 Sandro Gerbi e Raffaele Liucci, Indro Montanelli. Una biografia (1909-2001), (nuova ed. aggiornata dei due volumi apparsi per Einaudi), Collana Saggistica, Milano, Hoepli, 2014, .
 Giancarlo Mazzuca, Indro Montanelli. Uno straniero in patria. Prefazione di Roberto Gervaso, Collana Saggi, Cairo Publishing, 2015, .
  
 Alberto Mazzuca, Penne al vetriolo. I grandi giornalisti raccontano la prima Repubblica, Bologna, Minerva, 2017, .

External links

1909 births
2001 deaths
People from Fucecchio
20th-century Italian novelists
20th-century Italian male writers
Conservatism in Italy
Cycling journalists
Italian anti-communists
Italian anti-fascists
Italian fascists
Italian newspaper founders
Italian newspaper editors
Italian male journalists
Bancarella Prize winners
Slave owners